Alberto Guerra (born December 5, 1982) is a Cuban actor. He started his acting career in Telemundo's Vale Todo. He is currently in Crime Diaries: The Candidate a Netflix original series.

Filmography

Film

Television

Awards and nominations

References

External links
 

Cuban male film actors
Living people
People educated at Centro de Estudios y Formación Actoral
Cuban male television actors
21st-century Cuban male actors
1982 births
Cuban emigrants to Mexico